The 1973 Senior League World Series is a baseball competition that took place from August 11–18 in Gary, Indiana, United States. Taipei, Taiwan defeated Oxon Hill, Maryland in the championship game. It was Taiwan's second straight championship.

Teams

Results

Opening Round

Winner's Bracket

Loser's Bracket

Elimination Round

References

Senior League World Series
Senior League World Series
Baseball competitions in Indiana
Sports in Gary, Indiana
1973 in sports in Indiana